The Price of Betrayal is a 1915 Swedish silent drama film directed by Victor Sjöström. The film was considered lost until a nearly complete copy was located in 2017.

Cast
 Gabriel Alw
 Stina Berg
 Egil Eide as Blom
 Kaja Eide as Mrs. Blom
 John Ekman as Mr. Holck

References

External links

1915 films
1915 drama films
1915 short films
1910s rediscovered films
1910s Swedish-language films
Swedish drama films
Swedish silent short films
Swedish black-and-white films
Films directed by Victor Sjöström
Rediscovered Swedish films
Silent drama films